Carol Henry may refer to:

Carol Henry (actor) (1918–1987), American actor
Carol F. Henry (born 1939), American philanthropist from California
Carol Henry (photographer) (born 1960), American fine arts photographer

See also
Carl Henry (disambiguation)
Karl Henry (born 1982), English footballer
Caroline Henry (born 1969), English politician